The name Kirogi (Korean: 기러기 [kiɾʌ̹ɡi], NKR: kirŏgi) has been used for four tropical cyclones in the western Pacific Ocean. The name, contributed by North Korea, refers to non-domesticated geese.
 Typhoon Kirogi (2000) (T0003, 05W, Ditang) – passed close to Japan while weakening.
 Typhoon Kirogi (2005) (T0520, 21W, Nando) – not a threat to land.
 Severe Tropical Storm Kirogi (2012) (T1212, 13W)
 Tropical Storm Kirogi (2017) (T1725, 31W, Tino)

Pacific typhoon set index articles